Wise Music Group is a global music publisher, with headquarters in Berners Street, London. In February 2020, Wise Music Group changed its name from The Music Sales Group.

In 2014 Wise Music Group (as The Music Sales Group) acquired French classical music publisher Éditions Alphonse Leduc. Éditions Alphonse Leduc publishes classical music by French composers including Jacques Ibert, Henri Dutilleux, Olivier Messiaen, Francis Poulenc, and Joseph Canteloube. It also publishes operatic works by Italian composers Gioachino Rossini and Vincenzo Bellini, and works by Muzio Clémenti, Johannes Brahms, and Pyotr Tchaikovsky.

In March 2017, The Music Sales Group acquired disco publisher Bleu Blanc Rouge from Belgian record producer and songwriter Jean Kluger. In April 2018, Music Sales sold its physical and online print divisions, including Musicroom, to Milwaukee-based publisher Hal Leonard for $50 million. Hal Leonard will continue to distribute Wise Music's publishing catalogue worldwide.

Wise Music's catalogue of music includes US rights to "The Twist", best known from the recording by Chubby Checker).

Novello & Co

Novello & Co is a London-based printed music publishing company specializing in classical music, particularly choral repertoire. It was founded in 1811 by Vincent Novello. August Jaeger of the firm was a friend of Edward Elgar. It joined the Wise Music Group in 1993.

Chester Music
Chester Music is a British publisher of printed music specializing in classical composition and educational music of the 20th and 21st centuries.

MusicFirst
MusicFirst is the Digital Education Division of Wise Music Group, specializing in educational music software.

Selected imprints 

 Acorn (pennywhistles)
 Amsco Publications
 Ariel Publications (classical guitar only)
 E. J. Arnold & Son, Limited (recorder books)
 Ashley Publications Inc.
 Schuberth & Co., Inc.
 Larrabee Publications
 Lewis Music Publishing Co.
 Heritage Publications, Inc.
 Kammen Music Co.
 Bosworth Music GmbH, Berlin
 Campbell Connelly, founded by Jimmy Campbell and Reg Connelly
 Carlanita Music Company LLC, founded after the death Carlos Chávez by his daughter, Ana Chávez Ortiz), G. Schirmer, selling agent
 Chester Music Limited
 Eaton Music 
 Embassy Music, founded by Tommy Dorsey
 Edition Wilhelm Hansen
 Le Chant du Monde
 Nancy Music Company Inc., books of Chez "Bugs" Bower; né Maurice D. Bower; born 1922
 Node Records 
 Noel Gay Music Company, founded by Noel Gay
 Novello & Co., Ltd., London
 Oak Publications, folk music and pennywhistles books
 Omnibus Press
 Passantino Manuscript Papers
 Première Music Group
 Éditions Alphonse Leduc
 Éditions Choudens (fr)
 Éditions Bleu Blanc Rouge, founded by Jean Kluger
 Éditions Musicales Transatlantiques (fr), acquired in 2009 by Music Sales Group
 Rhinegold Education, a division acquired from Rhinegold Publishing by Music Sales Group in 2010
 G. Schirmer Inc. (subsidiary)
 Associated Music Publishers 
 J. Curwen & Sons Limited London
 Boston Music Company, founded in 1885 by Gustav Schirmer, Jr. (1864–1907)
 Schirmer Trade Books
 Shawnee Press, acquired by Music Sales Group. in 1989; sold, with Music Sales Group., in 2009 to Hal Leonard Corporation
 Sparta Florida Music Group, founded by Hal Shaper
 Storyville Records
 UME (Unión Musical Ediciones S.L.), founded in Bilbao in 1900; acquired by Music Sales Group in 1990
 Wise Publications
 Yorktown Music Press

References

External links
Wise Music Group Corporate website
Wise Music Classical Website
Wise Music Creative website

Music publishing companies of the United Kingdom
Sheet music publishing companies
Privately held companies of the United Kingdom